Vera Mikhailovna Sotnikova  (born July 19, 1960) is a Soviet and Russian theater and film actress, TV presenter. Repeatedly she starred in television movies and television series.

Biography
She graduated from Moscow Theater Actor's School under Oleg Yefremov and became a notable Soviet actress appearing in more than 40 movie productions between 1983 and 2008.

She was involved with a Soviet rocker Vladimir Kuzmin for 7 years, producing a number of video clips for him.

She is currently working in various theatres in Russia and is quite active in the movie business as well. She is a virtual unknown in the West, however, since all her movie and television work targeted Russian audiences.

Filmography
 The Most Charming and Attractive   (1985) as  Smirnov's girlfriend
 Courier (1986) as Natasha
 The End of Eternity (Конец Вечности) (1987) as Noÿs Lambent
 The Battle of the Three Kings  (1990) as Rubina
 The Alaska Kid (1991)  as Gina 
 Breakfast with a View to the Elbrus Mountains (1992)
Chivalric Romance (2000) as Countess Brigitta

References

External links
 
 Official site

Soviet film actresses
Russian film actresses
Soviet television actresses
Russian television actresses
Soviet stage actresses
Russian stage actresses
1960 births
Living people
Actresses from Moscow
Actors from Volgograd
Russian television presenters
Russian women television presenters
Moscow Art Theatre School alumni
Mass media people from Volgograd